Manny Pacquiao vs. David Díaz, billed as Lethal Combination, was a lightweight title boxing match. The bout took place on June 28, 2008, at the Mandalay Bay, Las Vegas, Nevada, U.S. Pacquiao defeated Diaz via technical knockout in the ninth round. After the fight, Pacquiao's performance sealed his status as the best pound-for-pound fighter because of the retirement of the undefeated five-division champion Floyd Mayweather Jr. weeks prior to the fight and put Pacquiao's name in the history books as the only Asian fighter to win five world titles in five weight classes.

Background 
Pacquiao came into the fight following a close bout in March 2008 split decision victory over Juan Manuel Marquez for a super featherweight title. Top Rank CEO Bob Arum matched Pacquiao against Diaz when Pacquiao decided to move up to lightweight division. Diaz, the WBC champion made his last 2 title defense by beating Ramon Montano and Pacquiao's most recent conqueror, Erik Morales, via unanimous decision in August 2007.

Fight summary and aftermath 
Pacquiao was stronger and faster than Diaz, pounding him with big punches from the first round on. Early in the bout, Pacquiao would step in and rip off three and four punch combinations at a time. He cut the nose of Diaz in the second round and a few rounds later he opened a gash above the right eye of Diaz, turning the fight into a bloody affair. The cut was bad enough to prompt the referee to have the doctor look at it twice during the fight. Pacquiao hurt Diaz with an uppercut in round eight and in the ninth round, a jab followed by a left hand that Diaz never saw coming, sent him down face first to the mat and the referee jumped in to stop the action.

Having The Ring and WBC super featherweight titles as well as the latter's lightweight version, Pacquiao decided to vacate his super featherweight titles. Light welterweight champion Ricky Hatton is eyed by Pacquiao as his next opponent.

Business 
Arum reported that the fight had made 12.5 million dollars (250,000 pay-per-view subscriptions at $49.95 each), earning Diaz his best payday of 850,000 dollars, whilst Pacquiao earned at least 3 million dollars. Official records revealed an attendance of 8,362 (out of a maximum capacity of 12,000).

References 

Diaz
2008 in boxing
Boxing in Las Vegas
2008 in sports in Nevada
Boxing on HBO
June 2008 sports events in the United States